Abdullah Al-Eyaf (born October 31, 1976) is a Saudi Arabian film director also known as Abdullah Al Eyaf or Abdullah Aleyaf. He has directed many award-winning films. 

His first film was a 42-minute documentary Cinema 500 km, which discusses the ban on cinemas in Saudi Arabia by following a young Saudi movie fan during his first trip outside the country to experience his first ever film in a theater. Al-Eyaf's second project was a 19-minute short film called Etaar ("A Frame"). His third short film he made was the 23-minute drama Matar ("Rain"), which was shown in many international film festivals around the world. His most recent project was the short film "Aayesh" in 2010, which won the Gulf Film Festival award for best short film and was well received by audiences and critics.

Abdullah Al-Eyaf works as an engineer for a living. He wrote a weekly column in the Al-Riyadh newspaper between 2007 and 2010. In 2007, he also co-established and edited a weekly cinema page for the Al-Watan newspaper.

Abdullah has been a jury member of many film festivals, such as Gulf Film Festival and Abu Dhabi Film Festival.

His first novel, Hole to Heaven, was nominated for the Arabic Booker Prize in 2021.

Awards
 Golden Palm - Short Documentary: Cinema 500 km, in Saudi Film Competition 2008
 Saudi Arabia's winner of International Young Creative Entrepreneur in 2008.
 Silver Palm - Short Drama Matar (aka Rain), in Saudi Film Competition 2008
 Special Jury Prize - GCC Films: Etaar (aka A Frame), Emirates Film Competition 2007
 1st Prize for Best Short Film - Official Competition: "Aayesh", Gulf Film Festival, 2010
 "Aleph" Second Best Short Film (SILVER): "Aayesh", Beirut International Film Festival 2010
 Best Screenplay: "Aayesh" Saudi Films Festival 2012.

See also

 Cinema 500 km

References

External links
 Coming Soon, Scorsese of Arabia, The Washington Post
 
 Interview with Saudi Film Director, Abdullah Al Eyaf by Mirza al-Khuwaylidi on Asharq Alawsat (January 3, 2007)
 A Frame website at EFC database

1976 births
Living people
Saudi Arabian film directors
People from Al-Hasa